The Julian Alps and Prealps (in Slovenian Julijske Alpe v širšem smislu, in Italian Alpi e Prealpi Giulie) are a mountain range in the eastern part of the Alps. They are located in Slovenia and in Italy.

Geography

SOIUSA classification 
According to SOIUSA (International Standardized Mountain Subdivision of the Alps) the Julian Alps and Prealps are an Alpine section, classified in the following way:
 main part = Eastern Alps
 major sector = Southern Limestone Alps
 section = Julian Alps
 code = II/C-34

Subdivision 
The range are divided in two subsections:
 Julian Alps (SL: Julijskih Alp; IT: Alpi Giulie) - SOIUSA code:II/C-34.I;
 Julian Prealps (SL: Julijske Predalpe; IT: Prealpi Giulie) - SOIUSA code:II/C-34.II.

Notable summits

Some notable summits of the Julian Alps and Prealps are:

References

Mountain ranges of Slovenia
Mountain ranges of Italy
Mountain ranges of the Alps